U-79 may refer to one of the following German submarines:

, a Type UE I submarine launched in 1916 and that served in World War I until surrendered 21 November 1918; became the French submarine Victor Reveille; broken up in 1935
 During World War I, Germany also had these submarines with similar names:
, a Type UB III submarine launched in 1917 and surrendered on 26 November 1918; broken up at Swansea in 1922
, a Type UC II submarine launched in 1916 and sunk after 5 April 1918
, a Type VIIC submarine that served in World War II until sunk on 23 December 1941
The number  in the Austro-Hungarian Navy was assigned to SM UB-49 when serving in the Mediterranean during World War I.

Submarines of Germany